The Model Husband (German:Der Mustergatte) may refer to:

 The Model Husband (1937 film), a German film
 The Model Husband (1956 film), a West German film
 The Model Husband (1959 film), a Swiss film